Leonard Myers may refer to:
Leonard Myers (politician) (1827–1905), American politician
Leonard Myers (American football) (1978–2017), American football player

See also
Leonard B. Meyer (1918–2007), American composer
Meyers Leonard (born 1992), American basketball player